Frank Bruce Melville (8 February 1903 – 18 January 1971) was an Australian rules footballer who played with North Melbourne in the Victorian Football League (VFL).

Notes

External links 

Frank Melville's playing statistics from The VFA Project

1903 births
1971 deaths
Australian rules footballers from Melbourne
North Melbourne Football Club players
Williamstown Football Club players
People from North Melbourne